Chris Isaak is the second album by Chris Isaak, released in 1987. After the poor commercial success of his debut, Isaak honed his style to a sophisticated R&B for his follow-up. The song "Blue Hotel" was a hit in France, and in the U.K. after being re-released in 1991 making the Top 20.

Track listing
All tracks composed by Chris Isaak; except where indicated

 "You Owe Me Some Kind of Love" – 3:51
 "Heart Full of Soul" (Graham Gouldman) – 3:20
 "Blue Hotel" – 3:10
 "Lie to Me" – 4:12
 "Fade Away" – 4:15
 "Wild Love" – 2:57
 "This Love Will Last" – 2:45
 "You Took My Heart" – 2:31
 "Cryin'" – 2:30
 "Lovers Game" – 2:55
 "Waiting for the Rain to Fall" – 3:39

Personnel
Adapted from album liner notes
Chris Isaak - guitar, vocals
James Calvin Wilsey - lead guitar
Kenney Dale Johnson - drums, vocals
Rowland Salley - bass
Prairie Prince - drums
Chris Solberg - bass
John Robinson - drums
Pat Craig - keyboards
Technical
Dave Carlson - recording engineer
Kim Champagne - art direction, design
Pamela Gentile - photography
Aaron Gregory - crew
Jeri McManus Heiden - art direction, design
Lee Herschberg - mixing
Erik Jacobsen - producer
Tom Mallon - recording engineer
Tim Ryan - crew tour manager
Bruce Weber - front cover photography
Mike Zagaris - photography

Charts

Sales and certifications

References

1986 albums
Chris Isaak albums
Warner Records albums
Albums produced by Erik Jacobsen